is a Japanese baseball pitcher who won a silver medal in the 1996 Summer Olympics. He also played for the Yomiuri Giants, Osaka Kintetsu Buffaloes, and the Tokyo Yakult Swallows in Nippon Professional Baseball from 1997 to 2005.

In 2008, he came to the United States to play in the independent Northern League with the Gary SouthShore RailCats. He posted a 1.69 earned run average in 42.2 innings pitched. Gary manager Greg Tagert later told the Chicago Tribune that Misawa "was the absolute best I’ve ever seen coming out the bullpen at our level." During the winter, Misawa played for the Caribes de Anzoátegui in the Venezuelan Professional Baseball League and pitched two thirds of an inning for the Leones del Escogido of the Dominican Professional Baseball League. In 2009, he played his final professional season with the Long Beach Armada of the Golden Baseball League.

References

External links
 
 
 

1974 births
Living people
Baseball people from Saitama Prefecture
Waseda University alumni
Nippon Professional Baseball pitchers
Olympic baseball players of Japan
Olympic silver medalists for Japan
Baseball players at the 1996 Summer Olympics
Olympic medalists in baseball
Yomiuri Giants players
Osaka Kintetsu Buffaloes players
Yakult Swallows players
Tokyo Yakult Swallows players
Chunichi Dragons players
Medalists at the 1996 Summer Olympics
Japanese baseball coaches
Nippon Professional Baseball coaches
Long Beach Armada players
Gary SouthShore RailCats players
Leones del Escogido players
Japanese expatriate baseball players in the Dominican Republic
Caribes de Anzoátegui players
Japanese expatriate baseball players in the United States
Japanese expatriate baseball players in Venezuela